Etynodiol, or ethynodiol, is a steroidal progestin of the 19-nortestosterone group which was never marketed. A diacylated derivative, etynodiol diacetate, is used as a hormonal contraceptive. Etynodiol is sometimes used as a synonym for etynodiol diacetate.

It was patented in 1955.

Pharmacology
Etynodiol is a prodrug of norethisterone, and is converted immediately and completely into norethisterone. Etynodiol is an intermediate in the conversion of the prodrug lynestrenol into norethisterone.

Chemistry

Etynodiol is a 19-nortestosterone derivative. Structurally, it is almost identical to norethisterone and lynestrenol, differing only in its C3 substituent. Whereas norethisterone has a ketone at C3 and lynestrenol has no substituent at C3, etynodiol has a hydroxyl group at the position.

Synthesis

Society and culture

Generic names
Etynodiol is the generic name of the drug and its , while ethynodiol is its .

References 

Ethynyl compounds
Androgens and anabolic steroids
Diols
Estranes
Prodrugs
Progestogens
Synthetic estrogens